Lathraea (toothwort) is a small genus of five to seven species of flowering plants, native to temperate Europe and Asia. They are parasitic plants on the roots of other plants, and are completely lacking chlorophyll. They are classified in the family Orobanchaceae.

The toothwort is a protocarnivorous plant. Most of the plant consists of a branched whitish underground stem closely covered with thick fleshy colourless leaves, which are bent over so as to hide the under surface; irregular cavities communicating with the exterior are formed in the thickness of the leaf. On the inner walls of these chambers are stalked hairs, which when stimulated by the touch of an insect send out delicate filaments by means of which the insect is killed and digested.

Etymology 
The genus name Lathraea derives from the ancient greek , meaning "clandestine", which is a reference to the fact that it is inconspicuous until it flowers.

Phylogeny 
The phylogeny of the genera of Rhinantheae has been explored using molecular characters. Lathraea is the sister genus to Rhinanthus, and then to Rhynchocorys. These three genera share phylogenetic affinities with members of the core Rhinantheae: Bartsia, Euphrasia, Tozzia, Hedbergia, Bellardia, and Odontites. Melampyrum appears as a more distant relative.

Species 
 Common toothwort (Lathraea squamaria) is parasitic on the roots of hazel and alder, occasionally on beech, in shady places such as hedge sides. Lathraea squamaria is widespread in Europe.
 Purple toothwort (Lathraea clandestina) grows on the roots of alder, poplar and willow. At Arduaine Garden in Argyll in the absence of the three well-known hosts it grows on the roots of a variety of ornamental trees and shrubs; in the same garden cats are frequently seen to roll in the flowers and to eat them. It differs in the dark purple flowers being produced one on each stem. Purple toothwort grows in Middle and South Europe: Western Belgium, Western and Central France and Northern Spain, and locally in Central Italy. Elsewhere, especially in the British Isles, the plant is locally naturalized in parks and old gardens.
Rhodope toothwort (Lathraea rhodopaea) is common in the Rhodope Mountains and Rila mountain range in southeastern Europe.

In Pavel Ivanovich Melnikov's "In the Forests" a Russian wise woman (znakharka) calls this plant Peter's Cross and says it protects against devils but only if collected with a prayer to God.

Notes

References 
 Flora Europaea: Lathraea
 Flora of China: Lathraea

Orobanchaceae
Orobanchaceae genera
Parasitic plants